Bittern Lake, originally named Rosenroll, is a village in central Alberta, Canada. It is located between Camrose and Wetaskiwin, on Highway 13.  The first post office opened in the home of Ernest Roper in 1899. It was known as the Village of Rosenroll between 1904 and 1911. The present name comes from Cree Indians in the area, on account of bittern near the lake.

The lake itself is not accessible by road, and is not recommended for boating or fishing due to its high counts of alkali and its shallow waters. 
Locals enjoy the scenic walking trails around the lake as well as observing the native birds that nest in the area.
The nearest shopping is in Camrose, Alberta.

Demographics 

In the 2016 Census of Population conducted by Statistics Canada, the Village of Bittern Lake recorded a population of 220 living in 86 of its 88 total private dwellings, a  change from its 2011 population of 224.

See also 
List of communities in Alberta
List of villages in Alberta

References

External links 

1904 establishments in Alberta
Villages in Alberta